Sphegina cultrigera is a species of hoverfly in the family Syrphidae found in Kambaiti Pass, Myanmar, a montane forest with swampy areas and streams located 2000 meters above sea level.

Etymology
The name is from Latin, cultrigera, bearing a knife, referring to the knife-like lobe on the male sternite IV.

Description
In male specimens, the body length is 5.3 millimeters. The wings are 4.5 millimeters long and hyaline with brownish stigma. The face is black and weakly concave with a weakly developed frontal prominence. The gena are shiny black; frons and vertex black and semi-shiny; lunula brownish; occiput dull black; antenna brown, basal flagellomere oval and baso-ventrally reddish, arista almost bare; thorax black; scutellum trapezoidal, shiny dorsally. The pro- and mesolegs are yellow, tarsomeres 4 and 5 black; metaleg with coxa brown, trochanter simple, yellow; metafemur yellow, the apical 1/6 and a broad annulus on the basal 1/2 brown; metatibia without apico-ventral tooth, yellow except the apical 1/4 black and brownish annulus on the basal 1/2 medially; metatarsus dark brown. The tergites are shiny black, tergite III with a yellow subanterior fascia, nearly 1/2 as wide as the length of tergite; sternite IV brown anteriorly and brownish posteriorly, the sword-like lobe on the left side pale yellowish; sternite VI black, with a very small tubercle at the posterior margin; sternites VII and VIII black. The surstyli are slightly asymmetrical, the cercus is enlarged, and the superior lobes are symmetrical. No female specimens are known.

Related Species
S. cultrigera is similar to S. siculifera, S. ensifera, and S. philippina. Unlike other Sphegina species, all bear a long sword-like lobe postero-laterally on the left side of male sternite IV. S. cultrigera differs from the other species by having a black gena, narrowly shiny frons above the lunula, and a metafemur 3.6 times longer than broad. S. philippina differs from the other species by having male genitalia with small cerci, strongly asymmetric surstyli, a metatibia produced into a spur apicoventrally, and a metafemur lacking a subapical paler annulus.

References

Eristalinae
Insects described in 2015
Diptera of Asia